Égide Rombaux (19 January 1865 – 11 September 1942) was a Belgian symbolist sculptor.

Rombeaux was born in Schaerbeek on 19 January 1865. the son of the sculptor Felix Rombaux and Emerence–Rosalie Lemmens. He studies at the Academie des Beaux Arts in Brussels from 1879 while simultaneously working as an assistant to Albert Desenfans. He received his first commission in 1887; sculptures of Antoine van der Noot and Antoine van Grimbergen for Brussels Town Hall. He worked in Florence from 1889 to 1992. He returned to Brussels in 1895, and taught at the academies in Antwerp and Brussels.

Rombaux died in Uccle on 11 September 1942.

The First Morning, a 1913 marble by Rombaux is in the collection of the Tate Britain. The Royal Museums of Fine Arts of Belgium, which have a large selection of his work, have a study.

Honours 
 1911: Member of the Royal Academy of Science, Letters and Fine Arts of Belgium.  
 1919: Commander of the Order Leopold.
 1931: Grand Officer in the Order of the Crown.

Awards 
At 17 years old, Rombaux was awarded the prix Godecharle in 1882. He won the Prix de Rome in 1891.

Legacy 
The Royal Academy of Science, Letters and Fine Arts of Belgium awards the triannual , established in 1943, to a sculptor between 25 and 45 years old.

Further reading

References 

Members of the Royal Academy of Belgium
Grand Officers of the Order of the Crown (Belgium)
Belgian sculptors
1865 births
1942 deaths